Yukihiro Hane (born August 26, 1962) is a Japanese racing driver.

Career 
Hane is active in automobile racing. He participates in both domestic and overseas races like the Macau Grand Prix and the FIA GT Championship; he was the first Japanese driver to fully participate in the latter.

After his debut, he participated in the Japanese Formula 3 Championship. In 1990, he ranked 4th after Naoki Hattori, Naohiro Furuya and Hisashi Wada.

He mainly drives Porsches and is well known as a Porsche messenger. At the Japan Touring Car Championship, he drove the Skyline GT-R and performed well in his vehicle without Nissan's support, but Masahiro Hasemi and Hideo Fukuyama won the championship.

Racing record

Complete Japanese Touring Car Championship results

Japanese Top Formula Championship results

References 

1962 births
Living people
Japanese racing drivers
Japanese Formula 3 Championship drivers
24 Hours of Le Mans drivers